The  is a railway line in Japan operated by Shikoku Railway Company (JR Shikoku). It connects Ikenotani Station and Naruto Station in Naruto, Tokushima.

History
In 1916 the Awa Electric Railway Co. opened a line from Nakahara to Naruto, including the Yoshinari–Ikenotani section, which is now part of the Kotoku Line.

In 1933 the company was nationalised.

CTC signalling was commissioned in 1977, and freight services ceased in 1984.

Former connecting lines
 Naruto station - A ferry to Fukura on Awaji Island enabled connection to the Awaji Railway Co. 23km 1067mm gauge line to Sumoto, where a ferry service to Tanagawa operated. The line opened between 1922 and 1925, was electrified at 600 VDC in 1947 and closed in 1966.

Services
Although the official start of the line is at Ikenotani, rail services from Naruto are considered outbound, with the reverse being inbound. This is to allow for more efficient connecting service to the Kōtoku Line at Ikenotani.

All regular trains are local service trains. Moreover, connections to the Uzushio limited express service on the Kōtoku Line are poor, with waits of thirty minutes to an hour for a train.

Some trains are wanman driver-only operated, with others also having a conductor on board. Due to short platform lengths, the trains of three cars or more only allow the doors of certain cars to open at those stations. In addition, the entire line is single-tracked, with no passing permitted anywhere along the line except at the terminuses of Ikenotani and Naruto.

Station list 
 All stations are located in Naruto, Tokushima.
 Local trains stop at all stations.
 Trains can pass one another at stations marked "◇" and "^" and cannot pass at those marked "｜".

See also
List of railway lines in Japan

References
This article incorporates material from the corresponding article in the Japanese Wikipedia

External links

 JR Shikoku official website 

Lines of Shikoku Railway Company
Rail transport in Tokushima Prefecture
1067 mm gauge railways in Japan
Railway lines opened in 1916